Baharestan (also Romanized as Bahārestān) is a village in Qasemabad Rural District, in the Central District of Rafsanjan County, Kerman Province, Iran. At the 2006 census, its population was 25, in 7 families.

References 

Populated places in Rafsanjan County